was a Japanese actress. She is known for her roles in television series Asuka (1999), Pride (2004), FlashForward (2009), and Miss Sherlock (2018) as well as films such as Ring (1998), Yomigaeri (2003), and Dog in a Sidecar (2007).

Life and career 
Takeuchi was born on 1 April 1980 in Urawa, Saitama, Japan. She was "discovered" during spring break in Harajuku after junior high school.

Takeuchi was married to Shidō Nakamura II (who had co-starred with Takeuchi in the film Be With You) from 10 May 2005 until their divorce on 29 February 2008. She had a son with Nakamura who was born in November 2005. Prior to the couple's divorce, Nakamura had apologized for a drunk driving incident where he was with actress Aya Okamoto and later seen with actress Saki Takaoka. After the drunk driving incident, Takeuchi reportedly moved to live in her management office shortly before filing for divorce in October 2006.

Takeuchi married actor Taiki Nakabayashi on 27 February 2019. Her son, in junior high school at the time was reported to have actively encouraged her second marriage. In November 2019, she announced she was pregnant and gave birth to her second son in January 2020.
 
Takeuchi was known for her earlier roles, starring in Japanese television dramas such as Mukodono (My Husband), Lunch no Joō (The Queen of Lunch), Egao No Hōsoku, and Pride, as well as NHK's Asadora television series Asuka.  In the romantic comedies Mukodono, she and Nagase Tomoya played newlyweds and in Lunch no Joō, she played a girl with a mysterious past who loves her lunch. In drama Egao no Hōsoku, her character experiences meeting new people while supporting a manga writer and in Pride, her character is the love interest of a hockey player portrayed by Takuya Kimura.

Takeuchi's earlier films include Hoshi Ni Negaiwo, Yomigaeri, and Be with You (Ima, Ai ni Yukimasu). Her performances in Yomigaeri (2003), Be With You (2004), and Spring Snow (2005) were recognized by the Japanese Academy Awards. She later won the Best Supporting Actress Award at the Japanese Academy Awards for her role in the 2014 film Cape Nostalgia.In 2010, Takeuchi appeared on the science fiction American TV serial FlashForward in two episodes (as a character portrayed in five). Director Michael Nankin called her "Japan's answer to Audrey Hepburn." Takeuchi's dialogue was in Japanese, but she said the experience caused her to make it a goal to master English as she wished she had been able to communicate better with  the other cast members and crew.

In 2018, Takeuchi portrayed the titular character in Hulu/HBO Asia series Miss Sherlock, an adaptation of Arthur Conan Doyle's Sherlock Holmes detective stories.

Death

On 27 September 2020 at 2:00a.m. (JST), Takeuchi was found hanged at her home in Shibuya, Tokyo. She was taken to the hospital, but died shortly afterwards. No suicide note has been found. She was 40 years old.

 Filmography 

 Television 
 Cyborg (1996 Fuji TV)
 Nice Guy (1997 Fuji TV)
 Shin-D (1997 NTV)
 Frozen Summer (1998 NTV) as Junko Moriguchi
 Setsunai (1998 TV Asahi)
 Dangerous Police Forever (1998 NTV) as Asuka Fubuki
 Kantaro Terauchi's Family in autumn 1998 (1998 TBS) as Misuzu Kawachi
 Nanisama (1998 TBS) as Yuri Kimura
 Romance (1999 NTV) as Kotoe Kurasawa
 Asuka (1999 NHK Asadora) as Asuka Miyamoto
 Friends (2000 TBS) as Miyuki Matsuno
 Stories of 100 Years in episode 2 (2000 TBS) as Toshiko Nagai
 Style! (2000 TV Asahi) as Shiori Sakakibara
 A White Shadow (2001 TBS) as Noriko Shimura
 Mukodono! (2001 Fuji TV) as Sakura Arai
 School Teacher (2001 TBS) as Motoko Asakura
 Lunch no Joō (2002 Fuji TV) as Natsumi Mugita
 The Law of the Smile (2003 TBS) as Yumi Kurasawa
 Autumn in Warsaw (2003 YTV) as Yoko Aoki
 Pride (2004 Fuji TV) as Aki Murase
 New York Love Story (2004 Fuji TV) as Eiko Fujikura
 Fukigen na Jiin (The Selfish Gene) (2005) as Yoshiko Aoi
 Bara no nai Hanaya (2008) as Miou Shirato
 FlashForward (2009 ABC) as Keiko Arahida
 Natsu no Koi wa Nijiiro ni Kagayaku (2010) as Shiori Kitamura
 Strawberry Night (2012) as Reiko Himekawa
 cheap flight (2013)
 Sanada Maru (2016 NHK) as Yodo-dono
 Kamoshirenai Joyū tachi (2016 Fuji TV) as herself
 A Life (2017 TBS) as Mifuyu Danjō
 Miss Sherlock (2018 Hulu, HBO) as Sara “Sherlock” Shelly Futaba (Sherlock Holmes)
 Innocent Days (2018 Wowow) as Yukino Tanaka
 Queen (2019 Fuji TV)

 Film 
 Innocent World (1998) – Ami
 Ring (1998) – Tomoko Oishi
 Big Show! Sing in Hawaii (1999) – Satomi Takahashi
 Night of the Shooting Star (2003) – Kana Aoshima
 Yomigaeri (2003) – Aoi Tachibana
 Heaven's Bookstore - The Light of Love (2004) – Shoko Hiyama / Kanako Nagase
 Be with You (2004) – Mio Aio
 Spring Snow (2005) – Satoko Ayakura
 A Dog on Sidecar (2007) – Yōko
 The World According to Chocolat (2007) – Chocolat
 Closed Note (2007) – Ibuki Mano
 Midnight Eagle (2007) – Keiko Arisawa
 The Glorious Team Batista (2008) – Kimiko Taguchi
 The Triumphant of General Rouge (2009) – Kimiko Taguchi
 No More Cry (2009) – Tetsuko Yamagishi
 Golden Slumbers (2010) – Haruko Higuchi
 Flowers (2010) – Kaoru
 1,778 Stories of Me and My Wife (2011) – Setsuko
 A Ghost of a Chance (2011)
 Hayabusa (2011, 20th Century Fox) – Megumi
 Cape Nostalgia (2014)
 Creepy (2016) – Yasuko Takakura
 The Magnificent Nine (2016) – Toki
 The Inerasable (2016) – I
 The Travelling Cat Chronicles (2018)
 The Confidence Man JP: The Movie (2019)
 A Long Goodbye (2019)
 The 47 Ronin in Debt (2019) – Riku
 The Confidence Man JP: Episode of the Princess (2020)

Other

 Narrator 
 Wonderful Spaceship Earth (2002 TV Asahi)
 If the World is 100 Villages 6 (2009 TV Fuji)
 The Nonfiction (2010 TV Fuji)
 Eko's manners (2011 BS Asahi)

 Dubbing roles Inside Out - JoyTitanic (2001 Fuji TV edition) - Rose DeWitt Bukater (Kate Winslet)

 Works 

 Essay 

 Nioi Fechi (2004 Pia)
 Nioi Fechi 2 calorie off (2006 Pia)

 Photo essay 
 Tabibon (travel diary of Tahiti) (2007 SDP)

 Supplies-of-provisions catalog 

 Takeuchi Marche

 Single 
 Tada Kaze Wa Fukukara (1998 Pony Canyon)

 Awards and nominations 

 Awards 
 2001: 9th Hashida Best Newcomer Award
 2001: 31st the Television Drama Academy Award: Best Supporting Actress for Gakkou no Sensei 2002: 34th the Television Drama Academy Award: Best Actress for Lunch no Joou 2002: 26th Élan d'or Award: Newcomer of the Year
 2002-2003: 6th Nikkan Sports Drama Grand Prix: Best Actress for Lunch no Joou 2004: 13th Japan Movie Critics Award: Best Actress for Yomigaeri 2005: 22nd Wakayama Citizen Movie festival: Best Actress for Ima, Ai ni Yukimasu 2005: 9th NIFTY Film Award: Best Actress for Ima, Ai ni Yukimasu 2005: Movie Walker Cinema Award: Best Actress for Ima, Ai ni Yukimasu 2003-2004: 7th Nikkan Sports Drama Grand Prix: Best Actress for Pride 2007: Osaka Movie Press Club Best Movie Award: Best Actress for Sidecar ni Inu 2007: 20th Nikkan Sports Film Award: Best Actress for Sidecar ni Inu 2007: 31st Fumiko Yamaji Award: Best Actress for Sidecar ni Inu 2008: 81st Kinema Junpo Award: Best Actress for Sidecar ni Inu, Closed Note, and Midnight Eagle 2008: 17th Japan Movie Critics Award: Best Actress for Sidecar ni Inu 2008: Yahoo! Japan Katteni Movie Award: Best Actress for Sidecar ni Inu and Closed Note 2008: 56th the Television Drama Academy Award: Best Supporting Actress for Bara no nai Hanaya 2010: 66th the Television Drama Academy Award: Best Supporting Actress for Natsu no Koi wa Nijiiro ni Kagayaku Nominations 
 2003: 27th Japan Academy Prize: Best Actress for Yomigaeri 2003: 46th Blue Ribbon Awards: Best Actress for Yomigaeri,Hoshi ni Negai wo 2004: 28th Japan Academy Prize: Best Actress for Ima, Ai ni Yukimasu 2004: 47th Blue Ribbon Awards: Best Actress for Ima, Ai ni Yukimasu,Heaven's Bookstore 2004: 14th Tokyo Sports Film Award: Best Actress for Ima, Ai ni Yukimasu 2004-2005: 8th Nikkan Sports Drama Grand Prix: Best Actress for Fukigen na Gene 2005: 29th Japan Academy Prize: Best Actress for Haru no Yuki 2007: 50th Blue Ribbon Awards: Best Actress for Sidecar ni Inu 2007: 17th Tokyo Sports Film Award: Best Actress for Sidecar ni Inu 2009: 34th Hochi Film Award: Best Actress for The Triumphant of General Rouge 2010: 35th Hochi Film Award: Best Supporting Actress for Golden Slumbers 2011: 36th Hochi Film Award: Best Actress for Hayabusa and 1,778 Stories of Me and My Wife''

References

External links 
  
 

1980 births
2020 deaths
2020 suicides
20th-century Japanese actresses
21st-century Japanese actresses
Japanese film actresses
Japanese television actresses
People from Saitama (city)
Japanese expatriates in the United States
Stardust Promotion artists
Asadora lead actors
Suicides by hanging in Japan
Suicides in Tokyo
Female suicides